The Vertigo of Bliss is the second studio album by British rock band Biffy Clyro. Produced with the band by Chris Sheldon, it was released by Beggars Banquet Records on 16 June 2003. The album reached number 48 on the UK Albums Chart, and spawned four singles. A deluxe remastered edition was released in 2012, which featured, in addition to the original 13 album tracks, a number of B-sides from the album's singles.

Cover artwork
The album cover for The Vertigo of Bliss was designed by comic book artist Milo Manara. Despite raising some controversy, the artwork was praised by music magazine ShortList who named it in their list of "The 50 Coolest Album Covers Ever", explaining that the "erotic and controversial" cover "only endeared [Biffy] more to the small but loyal fanbase they were beginning to cultivate". In an interview with ShortList, Neil said of the cover "we got quite a bad reaction to that artwork when it first came out [...] that was our first kind of lesson learned that perhaps not everyone shares your perspective on life, or what you value as art, because we were naive enough to be taken by surprise, and then I was naive enough that when people started saying, "Oh this is fucking schoolboy shit," I got really annoyed because I was like, "It's so not that - you're actually being schoolboy here by judging it on just a shallow level."

Reception

Critical reception to Biffy Clyro's second album was generally positive. Sean Adams of Drowned in Sound wrote "‘The Vertigo of Bliss’ is everything you want it to be and more. Promise. Spread the love, instil it into the hearts of all you know, give it time, and enjoy." Writing for newspaper The Guardian, Betty Clarke awarded the album four out of five stars, calling it "inventive and sublime". Praising singles "Questions and Answers" and "Eradicate the Doubt" in particular, Clarke praised the band for "juggling anger with adoration as they take indie sensitivity and embolden it with blistering rock fury", and said that the album "crackles with certainty". Mark Robertson of The List wrote, "Taking a teen obsession for G N'R and grunge and bonding it to a sense of incurable romanticism, they create something both tender and terror-filled."

Ex-Oceansize/Biffy Clyro touring guitarist Mike Vennart named the album as one of his favourites in 2016, saying "This is pretty much the perfect album. It’s long and sprawling. It’s got all those fanciful, silly ticks and twitches which make Biffy so strange. This record gave me a new love for spidery, wiry clean guitar."

Track listing

Personnel

Biffy Clyro
Simon Neil – vocals, guitars, production
James Johnston – bass, vocals, production
Ben Johnston – drums, vocals, production
Additional musicians
Kimberlee McCarrick – violin (tracks 1, 3 and 14)
Martin McCarrick – cello (tracks 1, 3 and 14)

Production personnel
Chris Sheldon – production, recording and engineering (all tracks except 17–20), mixing
Phil English – engineering
Sam Miller – engineering
DP Johnson – production (tracks 17–20)
S.A.G. – production (tracks 17–20)

Additional personnel
Chris Blair – mastering
Phil Lee – design
Stefan De Batselier – photography
Milo Manara – illustration

Release history

References

2003 albums
Biffy Clyro albums
Albums produced by Chris Sheldon
Beggars Banquet Records albums